Theodore Joseph Marchibroda (March 15, 1931 – January 16, 2016) was an American football quarterback and head coach in the National Football League (NFL). He spent his four years as an active player with the Pittsburgh Steelers (1953, 1955–1956) and Chicago Cardinals (1957). He was later head coach of the Colts in two different cities and decades, first in Baltimore during the 1970s and then Indianapolis during the 1990s. Upon joining the Baltimore Ravens in a similar capacity in 1996, he became the only individual to serve as head coach with both of Baltimore's NFL teams.

Playing career
Marchibroda played college football at Saint Bonaventure University and the University of Detroit, where he excelled as a quarterback, leading the nation with 1,813 yards passing in 1952.

Marchibroda was selected in the first round of 1953 NFL Draft by his hometown Pittsburgh Steelers as the fifth overall pick and the first quarterback selected. After one year, he left the Steelers to serve in the U.S. Army, and returned to the Steelers after his discharge. Marchibroda finished his professional playing career with the Chicago Cardinals in 1957.

Coaching career
Marchibroda began his coaching career in 1961 as an assistant for the Washington Redskins under Bill McPeak before joining the Los Angeles Rams in 1966 under first-year head coach George Allen. He went with Allen to the Redskins in 1971 and was the offensive coordinator.

Marchibroda's first head coaching appointment was with the Baltimore Colts beginning on January 15, 1975. Inheriting a 2–12 ballclub that was one of the two worst in the NFL in 1974, he led one of the two biggest turnarounds in pro football history when the Colts ended the 1975 regular season at 10–4 and qualified for the playoffs by winning the AFC East title for the first of three consecutive years. All three postseason appearances ended in divisional round losses, first to the Steelers in both 1975 and 1976 and the Oakland Raiders in 1977.

His time with the Baltimore Colts nearly lasted only a season when he resigned on September 5, 1976, in response to team owner Robert Irsay verbally abusing his players after a loss in the final preseason match to the Detroit Lions at the Pontiac Silverdome three nights earlier on September 2. Marchibroda was also at odds with general manager Joe Thomas over player personnel decisions. He was rehired two days later on September 7 after offensive and defensive coordinators Whitey Dovell and Maxie Baughan threatened to quit and the players considered boycotting practice, all in support of Marchibroda.

His five years as Colts head coach concluded with a pair of 5–11 last-place finishes in 1978 and 1979. The team was crippled by Irsay's acrimonious contract disputes with Lydell Mitchell and John Dutton which resulted in the players being traded to the San Diego Chargers and Dallas Cowboys respectively, Bert Jones' shoulder injuries that limited him to only seven games within those last two seasons and three years of questionable drafts. Marchibroda was relieved of his duties on December 27, 1979. He was succeeded by Mike McCormack on January 17, 1980.

After a one-year hiatus, he served as quarterbacks coach for the Chicago Bears in 1981 and offensive coordinator for the Detroit Lions in 1982 and 1983 and the Philadelphia Eagles in 1984 and 1985.

Marchibroda served as the quarterbacks coach and later offensive coordinator of the Buffalo Bills under head coach Marv Levy from 1987 to 1991. As offensive coordinator for the  Bills, he was influential in the evolution of the hurry-up offense. Levy, Marchibroda, and quarterback Jim Kelly used their version of the hurry-up offense, the "K-Gun" offense, more than any previous offense. Kelly would hurry to the line of scrimmage, preventing the defense from making substitutions, and called audibles at the line. The NFL later imposed a rule that allowed time for defense substitutions if the offense made substitutions, except after the two-minute warning of either half.

Marchibroda returned to the Colts, now based in Indianapolis, for a second stint as head coach on January 28, 1992. Similar to his first time with the franchise, the Colts had ended the previous campaign at 1–15, fired Ron Meyer after five winless games and replaced him with Rick Venturi on an interim basis. Marchibroda led the Colts to a 9–7 record in 1992. Three seasons later, the team fell a big play short of Super Bowl XXX when it lost the 1995 AFC Championship Game to the Steelers, but the playoff run did not guarantee job security for Marchibroda who parted ways with the Colts on February 9, 1996, after his demand for a contract extension of two years rather than one was rejected. Offensive coordinator Lindy Infante was promoted to succeed him on February 15.

Marchibroda's unemployment lasted only six days when he returned to Baltimore on February 15, 1996, as the first-ever head coach of a yet-to-be-named ballclub which was subsequently known as the Ravens. He replaced Bill Belichick who had been dismissed the previous day. After three losing seasons in which the Ravens went 16–31–1, Marchibroda was notified that he was not going to be retained on December 28, 1998. Brian Billick was named to succeed him just over three weeks later on January 20, 1999.

Broadcasting career
Marchibroda was a radio color commentator for the Indianapolis Colts from 1999 to 2006 alongside Bob Lamey.

Death
Marchibroda died on January 16, 2016, from natural causes at his home in Weems, Virginia, at the age of 84. He was survived by his wife Ann, their four children, and six grandchildren.

Accolades
 Marchibroda was named NFL Coach of the Year for 1975 by the Associated Press, Sporting News, and Pro Football Weekly; he was named AFC Coach of the Year by United Press International.
 Marchibroda is a member of Indianapolis Colts Ring of Honor. 
 Marchibroda is a member of the University of Detroit Sports Hall of Fame (Class of 1983).
 Marchibroda is a member of the St. Bonaventure University Athletics Hall of Fame (Class of 1970).
 Marchibroda was inducted into the National Polish-American Sports Hall of Fame in 1976.

Head coaching record

NFL

Coaching tree
NFL head coaches under whom Ted Marchibroda served:

 Bill McPeak: Washington Redskins (1961–1965)
 George Allen: Los Angeles Rams (1966–1970), Washington Redskins (1971–1974)
 Neill Armstrong: Chicago Bears (1981)
 Monte Clark: Detroit Lions (1982–1983)
 Marion Campbell: Philadelphia Eagles (1984–1985)
 Marv Levy: Buffalo Bills (1987–1991)

Assistant coaches under Ted Marchibroda who became NFL or college head coaches:

 Bill Belichick: Cleveland Browns (1991–95), New England Patriots (2000–present)
 Kirk Ferentz: Iowa (1999–present)
 Pat Hill: Fresno State (1997–2011)
 Lindy Infante: Green Bay Packers (1988-1991), Indianapolis Colts (1996–1997)
 Marvin Lewis: Cincinnati Bengals (2003–2018)
 Eric Mangini: New York Jets (2006–2008), Cleveland Browns (2009–2010)
 Jim Schwartz: Detroit Lions (2009–2013)
 Vince Tobin: Arizona Cardinals (1996–2000)
 Ken Whisenhunt: Arizona Cardinals (2007–2012), Tennessee Titans (2014–2015)

See also
 List of NCAA major college football yearly total offense leaders

References

External links
NFL bio (1997)

1931 births
2016 deaths
American football quarterbacks
Baltimore Colts head coaches
Baltimore Ravens head coaches
Buffalo Bills coaches
Chicago Bears coaches
Chicago Cardinals players
Coaches of American football from Pennsylvania
Detroit Lions coaches
Detroit Titans football players
Indianapolis Colts head coaches
Philadelphia Eagles coaches
Pittsburgh Steelers players
St. Bonaventure Brown Indians football players
Washington Redskins coaches
National Football League announcers
People from Franklin, Pennsylvania
Players of American football from Pennsylvania
American people of Polish descent
National Football League offensive coordinators